Griffin Television Tower Oklahoma (also known as KWTV Mast) was a 1975 ft (602 m) high guy-wired aerial mast for the transmission of two television stations in Oklahoma City, Oklahoma, United States built during 1954. The stations which transmitted from the tower were KWTV-DT and KETA. It was the tallest structure in the world at the time it was built, and it was the first structure to surpass the Empire State Building in height. The tower featured multiple levels of double guy wires to protect it against severe wind storms.  During 1956 KOBR-TV Tower in Caprock, New Mexico, became the world's tallest structure.  The tower was deconstructed during 2015.

See also
 List of masts

References

External links
 
 http://www.fybush.com/sites/2004/site-040129.html
 http://www.skyscraperpage.com/diagrams/?b532

Towers in Oklahoma
Buildings and structures in Oklahoma City
Radio masts and towers in the United States
Towers completed in 1954
1954 establishments in Oklahoma
2015 disestablishments in Oklahoma
Buildings and structures demolished in 2015